Nonlinearity is a property of mathematical functions or data that cannot be graphed on straight lines, systems whose output(s) are not directly proportional to their input(s), objects that do not lie along straight lines, shapes that are not composed of straight lines, or events that are shown or told out-of-sequence.

Science and mathematics 
 Nonlinear acoustics is a branch of physics and acoustics dealing with sound waves of sufficiently large amplitudes.
 A nonlinear complementarity problem is found in applied mathematics.
 Nonlinear control theory is the area of control theory which deals with systems that are nonlinear, time-variant, or both.
 Nonlinear dimensionality reduction is a simplification that assumes that the data of interest lie on an embedded non-linear manifold within the higher-dimensional space.
 Nonlinear element, or nonlinear device, is an electrical element which does not have a linear relationship between current and voltage, e.g. a diode.
 Nonlinear functional analysis is a branch of Mathematical Analysis that deals with nonlinear mappings.
 Nonlinear optics, in physics, examines the properties of light in media in which the polarization responds nonlinearly to the electric field.
 Nonlinear photonic crystals are periodic structures whose optical response depends on the intensity of the optical field that propagates into the crystal.
 Nonlinear programming is the process of solving an optimization problem, where some of the parameters are nonlinear.
 Nonlinear regression, in statistics, represents fitting a model equation that is not linear in its parameters to the data in a table.
 Nonlinear resonance in physics is the occurrence of resonance in a nonlinear system.
 Nonlinear Schrödinger equation is a nonlinear variation of the Schrödinger equation.
 Non-linear sigma model is found in quantum field theory.
 Nonlinear system, in mathematics, represents a system whose behavior is not expressible as a linear function of its descriptors.
 A nonlinear X-wave (NLX) is a multi-dimensional wave that can travel without distortion.
 Nonlinearity (journal) is a peer-reviewed scientific journal of the Institute of Physics and the London Mathematical Society.

Computing 
 Nonlinear gameplay, in computer and video games, presents players with challenges that can be completed in a number of different sequences.
 Non-linear editing, editing audio and/or video using random access to the source material
 Non-Linear Systems, a defunct computer manufacturer

Arts 
 Nonlinear narratives portray events in a non-chronological manner.

Other 
 Nonlinear pricing is a broad term that covers any kind of price structure in which there is a nonlinear relationship between price and the quantity of goods.
 Non-linear writing, a writing system whose symbols do not consist of lines
 Nonlinears, advanced androids in the Inquest of Pilot Pirx

See also 
Linear (disambiguation)